Greatest Hits '78-'90 is Riot's only compilation album, released exclusively by Sony Music Japan in 1993. The collection was also issued as a limited edition Starbox.

It contains no material from the Rhett Forrester era, focusing on the Guy Speranza and Tony Moore years only.

Track listing
"Warrior" - 3:50	+
"49er" - 4:37 ^	
"Overdrive" - 4:12 +	
"Kick Down the Wall" - 4:33 ^	
"Tokyo Rose" - 4:19 +	
"Road Racin'" - 4:32 ^	
"Narita" - 4:39 ^
"Flight of the Warrior" - 4:19 ~	
"Metal Soldiers" - 6:39 {}
"Runaway" - 5:12	{}
"Johnny's Back" - 5:34 ~	
"Sign of the Crimson Storm" - 4:40 ~	
"Killer" - 4:53 {}
"Storming the Gates of Hell" - 3:43 {}	
"Bloodstreets" - 4:40 ~	
"Thundersteel" - 3:52 ~

+ = taken from the album Rock City (1977)
^ = taken from the album Narita (1979)
~ = taken from the album Thundersteel (1988)
{} = taken from the album The Privilege of Power (1990)

References

Riot V albums
1993 greatest hits albums
Sony Music Entertainment Japan compilation albums